Road Trips Volume 2 Number 2 is a two-CD live album by the American rock band the Grateful Dead.  The sixth in their "Road Trips" series of albums, it was the first to contain a complete concert—the February 14, 1968, show at the Carousel Ballroom (later known as the Fillmore West) in San Francisco, California.  Bonus material on Disc 1, as well as the bonus disc offered to early purchasers, comes from the Grateful Dead and Quicksilver Messenger Service "Tour of the Great Pacific Northwest", immediately preceding the Carousel Ballroom show.  The album was released on March 21, 2009.

The Carousel & Seattle concerts

Although the Valentine's Day show at the Carousel was not the first rock concert there, it was the first show under the management auspices of the Dead, Quicksilver and Jefferson Airplane, who had leased the venue to compete with the Avalon Ballroom and Bill Graham's Fillmore Auditorium.  Thus, the show was billed as the "Grand Opening".  The Grateful Dead shared the bill with Country Joe and the Fish.  The cover of Road Trips Volume 2 Number 2 incorporates artwork by Stanley Mouse that was used in the poster promoting the concert.

Live material from this show, along with recordings of other concerts from the same era, was used in the creation of Anthem of the Sun, a Dead album that is an amalgam of studio and live material.

The seven tracks from Seattle are believed to have been mislabeled. The show actually occurred on January 27, 1968, not January 23.

Dark Star

Road Trips Volume 2 Number 2 contains two performances of "Dark Star" — one from the February 14, 1968 concert at the Carousel Ballroom, and one from February 2, 1968, at the Crystal Ballroom in Portland, Oregon.  A third performance of the song, from the Eagles Auditorium in Seattle, Washington, is included on the bonus disc.

Track listing

Disc one

First set:

Bonus material, January–February 1968

Disc two

Second set:
"That's It for the Other One" – 9:30 →
"Cryptical Envelopment" (Garcia)
"The Other One" (Weir, Kreutzmann)
"Cryptical Envelopment" (Garcia)
"New Potato Caboose" (Lesh, Robert Petersen) – 8:48 →
"Born Cross-Eyed" (Weir) – 2:38 →
"Spanish Jam" (Grateful Dead) – 12:28
"Alligator" (Lesh, McKernan, Hunter) – 14:30 →
"Caution (Do Not Stop on Tracks)" (Garcia, Kreutzmann, Lesh, McKernan, Weir) – 10:00 →
"Feedback" (Garcia, Kreutzmann, Lesh, McKernan, Weir) – 6:10
Encore:
"In the Midnight Hour" (Steve Cropper, Wilson Pickett) – 10:35

Bonus disc
Bonus material, January 1968:
"Viola Lee Blues" (Noah Lewis) (1/23/68 Seattle, WA) – 22:46
"Good Morning Little School Girl" (Sonny Boy Williamson) (1/20/68 Eureka, CA) – 12:14
"New Potato Caboose" (Lesh, Petersen) (1/30/68 Eugene, OR) – 12:40
"Dark Star" (Grateful Dead, Hunter) (1/23/68 Seattle, WA) – 7:45 →
"China Cat Sunflower" (Garcia, Hunter) (1/23/68 Seattle, WA) – 5:08 →
"The Eleven" (Hunter, Lesh) (1/23/68 Seattle, WA) – 6:00
"Turn On Your Love Light" (Scott, Malone) (1/23/68 Seattle, WA) – 12:55

Personnel

Musicians

 Jerry Garcia – lead guitar, vocals
 Mickey Hart – drums
 Bill Kreutzmann – drums
 Phil Lesh – electric bass, vocals
 Ron "Pigpen" McKernan – organ,  vocals
 Bob Weir – rhythm guitar, vocals

Production

 Produced by Grateful Dead
 Compilation produced by David Lemieux and Blair Jackson
 Recorded by Dan Healy
 CD Mastering by Jeffrey Norman at Garage Audio Mastering, Petaluma CA
 Audio Restoration by Jamie Howarth / Plangent Processes
 Cover art by Scott McDougall
 Original Poster by Stanley Mouse
 Photo by Ted Streshinsky
 Package design by Steve Vance
 Special Thanks to Matt Smith

References

Road Trips albums
2009 live albums